ICRA may refer to:

 ICRA Limited, an Indian credit ratings agency
 Indian Civil Rights Act of 1968, a United States Act regarding civil rights of American Indians/Native Americans
 International Cultivar Registration Authority, organisation responsible for registering new cultivars of a particular genus
 Internet Content Rating Association, an international non-profit organization
 Irish Civil Rights Association, a United Kingdom political party
 International Conference on Robotics and Automation, an academic conference sponsored by IEEE
 International Center for Relativistic Astrophysics, research organization with headquarters in Rome, Italy
 The Catalan Institute for Water Research
 Infection Control Risk Assessment, a documented process to identify and develop infection prevention within hospitals